Camurac is a commune of the Aude department southern France.

It is located in the Pyrenees about 25 km from the border of Andorra.

Population

See also
Communes of the Aude department

References

Communes of Aude
Aude communes articles needing translation from French Wikipedia